Qassab Mahalleh (also Romanized as Qaşşāb Maḩalleh; also known as Qaşşāb Deh) is a village in Layalestan Rural District, in the Central District of Lahijan County, Gilan Province, Iran. At the 2006 census, its population was 512, in 153 families.

References 

Populated places in Lahijan County